Qaemabad Rural District is in the Central District of Shahriar County, Tehran province, Iran. At the National Census of 2006, its population was 30,682 in 7,571 households. There were 3,900 inhabitants in 1,065 households at the following census of 2011. At the most recent census of 2016, the population of the rural district was 3,386 in 1,000 households. The largest of its two villages was Mahmudabad-e Khalajabad, with 2,433 people.

References 

Shahriar County

Rural Districts of Tehran Province

Populated places in Tehran Province

Populated places in Shahriar County